Katya Bebb Cobham (Berger) (born 1966) (sometimes credited as Katia Berger or Katja Berger) is a film actress.

Biography 
Katya Berger was born on 13 December 1966 in London, England. She is the daughter of Hugh Russell Bebb and the Croatian singer and actress Hanja Kochansky. She is also the step-daughter of veteran Spaghetti Western Austrian actor William Berger. Her step-brother is former child actor Kasimir Berger, and she is the half-sister of actress Debra Berger. She appeared in a handful of films from 1978 to 1983, often in very sexually explicit roles and scenes. After a twenty-plus year hiatus from acting, she appeared in Ingrid Gogny's short film, 13/14. She quit acting to be a stay-at-home mom of two children with her husband. Her daughter, Maleah Sky Cobham, works as a lifeguard most summers and attends university in the state of Pennsylvania as an education major.

Filmography
 Piccole labbra (1978) .... Eva
 An Almost Perfect Affair (1979) .... Maria & Freddie's Daughter
 Storie di ordinaria follia or Tales of Ordinary Madness (1981) .... Girl on beach
 Rosso sangue (1981) .... Katia Bennett
 Nana (1982) .... Nana
 La Lune dans le caniveau (1983) (as Katia Berger) .... Catherine
 13/14 (2004) (as Katia Berger) .... Carole, la marraine
 That Day (2007)

References

1966 births
Living people
English film actresses
People from London